Floyd Hill is an unincorporated community and a census-designated place (CDP) located in and governed by Clear Creek County, Colorado, United States. The CDP is a part of the Denver–Aurora–Lakewood, CO Metropolitan Statistical Area. The population of the Floyd Hill CDP was 1,048 at the United States Census 2020. The Evergreen post office (Zip Code 80439) serves the area.

History
Floyd Hill is named after Merril H. Floyd, head of the Clear Creek Wagon Road Company that operated in the 1860s.  Mr. Floyd owned a ranch on a hill in the area and the land around the hill, which became known as "Floyd's Hill", where his company built a wagon road over from Idaho Springs to Bergen's ranch.

Geography

Demographics

See also

Outline of Colorado
Index of Colorado-related articles
State of Colorado
Colorado cities and towns
Colorado census-designated places
Colorado counties
Clear Creek County, Colorado
Colorado metropolitan areas
Front Range Urban Corridor
North Central Colorado Urban Area
Denver-Aurora-Boulder, CO Combined Statistical Area
Denver-Aurora-Broomfield, CO Metropolitan Statistical Area

References

External links

Floyd Hill Area Property Owners Association
Clear Creek County website

Census-designated places in Clear Creek County, Colorado
Census-designated places in Colorado
Denver metropolitan area